Elise Constance Mourant (29 October 1921 – 29 April 1990) was a New Zealand artist. Works by Mourant are held in the collection of the Museum of New Zealand Te Papa Tongarewa.

Education 
Mourant studied at Wellington Technical College prior to World War II, alongside Thomas Arthur McCormack and Nugent Welch. She studied painting at the National College of Art and Design in Dublin, the Slade School of Fine Art in London, and the Elam School of Fine Art in Auckland from 1943.

Career 
Mourant was known for her landscapes, still life paintings, and urban scenes. She exhibited with the Auckland Society of Arts (with solo exhibitions in 1947 and 1949) and the New Zealand Academy of Fine Arts. She also exhibited with Christchurch-based art association, The Group, in 1950. She was a member of the Rutland Group of artists, along with John Weeks, John and Charles Tole, and Ida Eise.

Works by Mourant include: Summer landscape, Auckland; Irises; Lily Lane, Melbourne, and Poppies and cistus.

References

Further reading 
Artist files for Mourant are held at:
 Angela Morton Collection, Takapuna Library
 Te Aka Matua Research Library, Museum of New Zealand Te Papa Tongarewa
Also see:
 Concise Dictionary of New Zealand Artists McGahey, Kate (2000) Gilt Edge

1921 births
1990 deaths
New Zealand painters
People associated with the Museum of New Zealand Te Papa Tongarewa
People from Wellington City
People associated with the Rutland Group
Elam Art School alumni
University of Auckland alumni
New Zealand women painters
People associated with the Auckland Society of Arts
People associated with The Group (New Zealand art)